Golden Horseshoes (translit. Safa'ih min dhahab) is a 1989 Tunisian drama film directed by Nouri Bouzid. It was screened in the Un Certain Regard section at the 1989 Cannes Film Festival.

Plot
Youssef Soltane, a 45-year-old Tunisian intellectual, is the product of a generation that lived the era of euphoria and great ideologies in the sixties, and their subsequent failure. He was incarcerated and tortured for his political opinions. Furthermore, his relationship with Zineb, a young, beautiful bourgeois, only brings him more trouble. During one long winter night, Youssef wanders in search of an emotional haven, prey to all the questions that flood his memory.

Cast
 Hichem Rostom as Youssef
 Hamadi Zarrouk
 Michket Krifa
 Chadia Azzouz
 Fatma Attia
 Sondos Belhassen
 Saida Ben Chedli
 Bechir Bouzaiane
 Walid Bouzayane
 Sabah Bouzouita
 Marianne Catzaras
 Khaled El Bibi
 Martine Gafsi
 Fethi Haddaoui
 Rym Kechiche
 Farah Khadar
 Rached Manai

References

External links

1989 films
1980s Arabic-language films
1989 drama films
Films directed by Nouri Bouzid
Tunisian drama films